Walter Kozak (1931 – 6 March 2016) was a Canadian boxer. He competed in the men's welterweight event at the 1956 Summer Olympics.

References

1931 births
2016 deaths
Canadian male boxers
Olympic boxers of Canada
Boxers at the 1956 Summer Olympics
Place of birth missing
Welterweight boxers